Andrespol  is a village in Łódź East County, Łódź Voivodeship, in central Poland. It is the seat of the gmina (administrative district) called Gmina Andrespol.

The village has a population of 3,367.

On October 20, 1807 Magdalena von Jordan-Tuchecka from Bedón signed a settlement agreement with 29 settler families of Low German descent from Pomerania. The settlers had already come to the region during the Prussian rule (1793-1806), probably around 1805. The newly created village was initially given the German name Andreasfeld. It consisted of 29 hooves for the settlers, other hooves were to be divided between the teacher and the village mayor. The colonists were promised six years of freedom from taxation during which they were to clear their land and build residential and commercial buildings from their own funds. 

In 1807 the region had become a part of the newly established Duchy of Warsaw and from 1815 it was part of Congress Poland. The Protestant church was destroyed 1945.

References
 Central Statistical Office (GUS) Population: Size and Structure by Administrative Division - (2007-12-31) (in Polish) 

Andrespol
Piotrków Governorate
Łódź Voivodeship (1919–1939)